Ronald or Ron Walker may refer to:

Ron Walker (businessman) (Ronald Joseph Walker, 1939–2018), Australian businessman and Lord Mayor of Melbourne
J. Ronald Walker, architect or builder of Payette City Hall and Courthouse in Payette, Idaho, USA
Ron Walker (English footballer) (born 1932), English football player for Doncaster Rovers and Bath City
Ron Walker (Australian footballer)
(Ronald) Bruce Walker (politician, born 1897) (1897–1981), New South Wales politician
Ronald Walker (cricketer) (1926–2011), Australian cricketer
Ronald Walker (economist) (1907–1988), Australian diplomat and economist
Ronald Walker (British politician) (1880–1971), Liberal politician in England
Ronald Walker (weightlifter) (1907-1948), British Olympic weightlifter
Ronald H. Walker (born 1937), first Director of the White House Office of Presidential Advance and American executive
Ronald W. Walker (1939–2016), Mormon historian
R. Tracy Walker, Republican politician in North Carolina